Margaret Scriven defeated Helen Jacobs 7–5, 4–6, 6–1 in the final to win the women's singles tennis title at the 1934 French Championships.

Seeds
The seeded players are listed below. Margaret Scriven is the champion; others show the round in which they were eliminated.

 Helen Jacobs (finalist)
 Margaret Scriven (champion)
 Alice Marble (second round)
 Betty Nuthall (third round)
 Simonne Mathieu (semifinals)
 Kay Stammers (quarterfinals)
 Sylvie Henrotin (second round)
 Lolette Payot (quarterfinals)

Draw

Key
 Q = Qualifier
 WC = Wild card
 LL = Lucky loser
 r = Retired

Finals

Earlier rounds

Section 1

Section 2

Section 3

Section 4

References

External links
 

1934 in women's tennis
1934
1934 in French women's sport
French